Bathybela nudator is a species of sea snail, a marine gastropod mollusk in the family Raphitomidae.

Description
The average length of the shell measures 50 mm and its diameter 17 mm.

Distribution
This species is found in the Atlantic Ocean off the Azores.

References

 Bouchet, P. & Warén, A., 1980. Revision of the northeast Atlantic bathyal and abyssal Turridae (Mollusca, Gastropoda). Journal of Molluscan Studies: 1–119, sér. Suppl.8
 Gofas, S.; Le Renard, J.; Bouchet, P. (2001). Mollusca. in: Costello, M.J. et al. (eds), European Register of Marine Species: a check-list of the marine species in Europe and a bibliography of guides to their identification. Patrimoines Naturels. 50: 180-213
 Mayhew, R. and F. Cole. 1994 MS. A taxonomic discussion and update of shell-bearing marine molluscs recorded from NW Atlantic North of Cape Cod (excluding Greenland), and Canadian Arctic Archipeligo.

External links
 Locard, A., 1897 Mollusques testacés. In: Expéditions scientifiques du Travailleur et du Talisman pendant les années 1880, 1881, 1882, 1883, vol. 1, p. 516 p, 22 pls
 MNHN, Paris : image
 

nudator
Gastropods described in 1897